The first season of the American comedy television series It's Always Sunny in Philadelphia premiered on FX on August 4, 2005. The season contains 7 episodes and concluded airing on September 15, 2005.

Season synopsis
This season, the gang inadvertently turns Paddy's Pub into a gay bar after one of Sweet Dee's acting class members invites his gay friends over to drink while  Mac and Charlie try to prove to Charlie's crush that they are not prejudiced against African Americans. Then Charlie becomes a father when an old flame reveals that the son she has is his—and Charlie attempts to get a paternity test at a free clinic but the old flame finally reveals that is not true, while Mac and Dennis frequent pro- and anti-abortion rallies to pick up women. The gang then turns their bar into a safe haven for underage drinkers—and find themselves regressing to their high school ways when they get invited to the prom. Charlie fakes a cancer diagnosis and the gang looks for a woman to sleep with him before he dies.

The gang then gets gun-crazy when their bar has been robbed and Dee dates a man who may be the culprit. Following that, the gang finds a dead man in one of their booths and Dee and Dennis visit their ailing (Nazi) grandfather at a nursing home. Finally, Charlie is suspected of being a victim of child molestation when a former gym teacher is accused of sexually molesting his students—and Mac is livid that  was not one of the victims.

Cast

Main cast
 Charlie Day as Charlie Kelly
 Glenn Howerton as Dennis Reynolds
 Rob McElhenney as Ronald "Mac" McDonald
 Kaitlin Olson as Deandra "Dee" Reynolds

Recurring cast
 Mary Elizabeth Ellis as The Waitress

Guest stars
 Malcolm Barrett as Terrell
 Autumn Reeser as Megan
 Heather Donahue as Stacy Corvelli
 Jaimie Alexander as Tammy
 Artemis Pebdani as Artemis
 Brittany Daniel as Carmen
 Michael Rosenbaum as Colin
Lindsey McKeon as Rebecca Keane
 Dennis Haskins as Chris Murray
 Lynne Marie Stewart as Charlie's Mother
 Jimmi Simpson as Liam McPoyle
 Nate Mooney as Ryan McPoyle
 Andrew Friedman as Charlie's uncle Jack

Episodes

Reception
The first season received positive reviews. On Rotten Tomatoes, it has an approval rating of 78% with an average score of 7.9 out of 10 based on 18 reviews. The website's critical consensus reads, "It's Always Sunny in Philadelphias coarse humor and shabby style may be rough around the edges, but this sinful sitcom wrings a surprising amount charm from its band of charmless underachievers."

Home media

References

External links

 
 

2005 American television seasons
It's Always Sunny in Philadelphia